Caradrina flava is a moth of the family Noctuidae. It was described by Charles Oberthür in 1876. It is found in Spain and Greece and on Malta and the Canary Islands, as well as from the Sahara to the Arabian Peninsula, Israel, Jordan, the Levant, Iran and Iraq.

There are two generations per year with adults on wing from October to December and again from February to April.

References

External links
 "Caradrina flava Oberthur, 1876". BioLib. Retrieved October 10, 2020.

Moths described in 1876
Caradrinini
Moths of Europe
Moths of the Middle East